Moorooka railway station is located on the Beenleigh line in Queensland, Australia. It serves the Brisbane suburb of Moorooka. The station opened in 1887.

To the west of the station lies the NSW North Coast dual gauge line primarily used by Gold Coast, NSW TrainLink XPT and freight services, and the Clapham freight yard.

In 1996, as part of the construction of the Gold Coast line, the standard gauge line was converted to dual gauge.

Moorooka passenger station is opposite the Clapham goods railway station.

Services
Moorooka station is served by all stops Beenleigh line services from Beenleigh, Kuraby and Coopers Plains to Bowen Hills and Ferny Grove.

Services by platform

Diagram 

 Moorooka station and Clapham goods

References

External links

Moorooka station Queensland's Railways on the Internet
[ Moorooka station] TransLink travel information

Railway stations in Brisbane
Railway stations in Australia opened in 1887
Moorooka, Queensland